Knochenkult is the seventh studio album by the German dark metal band Eisregen, released as Jewelcase, Digipak with the Bonustrack `Blut ist Leben´ and a boxset with a shirt, the digipak which is limited to 1000 copies through Massacre Records in 2008.

Track listing
"Stahlschwarzschwanger" – 6:09
"Treibjagd" – 5:03
"Erscheine!" – 6:09
"Das liebe Beil" – 5:29
"19 Nägel für Sophie" – 5:02
"Sei Fleisch und Fleisch sei tot" – 2:46
"Schwarzer Gigolo" – 4:33
"Süßfleisches Nachtgebet" – 5:52
"Das letzte Haus am Ende der Einbahnstraße" – 3:10
"Knochenkult" – 5:20
"Blut ist Leben" (Bonus-Track on limited Digipak-Version)

Credits
 Michael "Blutkehle" Roth − vocals
 Michael "Bursche" Lenz − guitar, bass
 Frau N. Feind - violin
 Franzi „Dr. Franzenstein“ - keyboards
 Ronny "Yantit" Fimmel − drums

External links
 Review von Blutkehle

2008 albums
Eisregen albums
Massacre Records albums